The Vanguard Way is a long-distance walk of  from  East Croydon station in outer London (OS grid reference ), travelling from the north, to Newhaven, on the south coast of England. It passes through the counties of Surrey, Kent and East Sussex, between Croydon and Newhaven, East Sussex.  It connects the London suburbs to the south coast, via the North Downs, Ashdown Forest, South Downs National Park and the Cuckmere valley.

The walk was developed in celebration of the 15th anniversary in 1980 of the Vanguards Rambling Club, who named themselves after an occasion when they returned from a walk travelling in the guard's van of a crowded train. The route's formal establishment occurred on 3 May 1981, and the Vanguards Rambling Club have remained as the route's management.

The Vanguard Way connects with central London with the Wandle Trail along the River Wandle from Croydon and is sometimes used as a walking route between London and Paris, connecting with the ferry ports on the south coast.  The walk also connects with the  London Outer Orbital Path, North Downs Way, Greensand Way, London Countryway, Eden Valley Walk, Forest Way, Wealdway, Sussex Border Path, the South Downs Way and the England Coast Path.

Places on the way 

Croydon
Woldingham
Crockham Hill
Forest Row
Blackboys
Berwick
Alfriston
Seaford
Newhaven

Gallery

References

External links 

  –  includes a free downloadable guide to the route
 The Vanguard Way – detailed coverage by Long Distance Walkers Association
 Interactive map of the Vanguard Way – from The Walking Englishman

Transport in the London Borough of Croydon
Footpaths in Surrey
Footpaths in East Sussex
Long-distance footpaths in England
Ashdown Forest